

Karl-Theodor Molinari (7 February 1915 – 11 December 1993) was an officer in the German Army and later in the Bundeswehr. He resigned in 1970 with the rank of a Generalmajor after it became public that he had possibly been involved in the shooting of 105 French resistance fighters in the Ardennes area on 12/13 June 1944. These allegations have not been proven since. Besides, Molinari was a politician, representative of the German Christian Democratic Union in the afterwar years.

Awards
Iron Cross (1939) 2nd and 1st Class 
German Cross in Gold (3 February 1943)
Knight's Cross of the Iron Cross on 3 November 1944 as Major and commander of the I./Panzer-Regiment 36

See also
List of German Christian Democratic Union politicians

References

Citations

Bibliography

External links
 Christlich Demokratische Union Deutschlands web site
 Der Spiegel 42/1969

1915 births
1993 deaths
Military personnel from Bonn
Bundeswehr generals
Major generals of the German Army
Recipients of the Gold German Cross
Recipients of the Knight's Cross of the Iron Cross
Christian Democratic Union of Germany politicians
People from the Rhine Province